The Anglican Diocese of Trinidad and Tobago is the administrative structure grouping together Anglicans in the nation of Trinidad and Tobago under a bishop. It is one of eight dioceses of the Church in the Province of the West Indies.

As of 2009, it included 30 parishes, and was responsible for 59 primary schools, one special school, and nine high schools.  The cathedral church is Holy Trinity Cathedral, Port of Spain.

The current bishop of Trinidad and Tobago is The Right Reverend Claude Berkley.

History
The diocese was set up in 1872. Originally, the area was nominally under the charge of the Bishop of London, a situation that had been assumed to hold from 1660 onwards. In 1813, the then Bishop of London denied it was his responsibility, and so it turned out that clergy appointments to the Church in the Colonies were recommended by the local governor, in this case the Governor of the Leeward Islands. From 1824 until 1872 the area was administered by the Bishop of Barbados. The coat of arms of the diocese was granted by the College of Arms in London in 1951, and includes the Alpha and Omega and a version of the Shield of the Trinity.

Bishops
 1872–1889: Richard Rawle
 1889–1904: Thomas Hayes
 1904–1916: John Welsh
 1918–1945: Arthur Anstey (also Archbishop of the West Indies, 1943–45)
 1946–1949: Fabian Jackson
 1951–1956: Douglas Wilson
 1957–1961: Noel Chamberlain
 1962–1970: James Hughes
1967–1972: Guy Marshall, suffragan for Venezuela (became Bishop in Venezuela, 1972–1974)
 1970–1993: Clive Abdulah
 1993–2001: Rawle Douglin
 2001–2011: Calvin Bess
 2011–present: Claude Berkley

See also
 Religion in Trinidad and Tobago

References

External links
 Official website

Trinidad
Anglican bishops of Trinidad and Tobago
Church in the Province of the West Indies